Bruno Neri (12 October 1910 – 10 July 1944) was an Italian footballer who played as a midfielder, and a World War II partisan.

Football career 
Neri played club football for Faenza, Fiorentina, Lucchese and Torino; he also earned three caps for the Italian national team.

Activities during World War II 
In 1940, Neri began combining his playing career with anti-fascist activities; he was killed in an ambush by German troops at Marradi on 10 July 1944.

References

1910 births
1944 deaths
Italian footballers
Italy international footballers
Serie A players
Serie B players
ACF Fiorentina players
S.S.D. Lucchese 1905 players
Torino F.C. players
Italian anti-fascists
Italian resistance movement members
Resistance members killed by Nazi Germany
Association football midfielders
Italian civilians killed in World War II